Rahul Buddhi (born 20 September 1997) is an Indian cricketer. He made his first-class debut on 19 January 2020, for Hyderabad in the 2019–20 Ranji Trophy. He made his Twenty20 debut on 10 January 2021, for Hyderabad in the 2020–21 Syed Mushtaq Ali Trophy. He made his List A debut on 8 December 2021, for Hyderabad in the 2021–22 Vijay Hazare Trophy. In February 2022, he was bought by the Mumbai Indians in the auction for the 2022 Indian Premier League tournament.

References

External links
 

1997 births
Living people
Indian cricketers
Hyderabad cricketers
Place of birth missing (living people)